Zarečica is a settlement west of Ilirska Bistrica in the Inner Carniola region of Slovenia.

References

External links
Zarečica on Geopedia

Populated places in the Municipality of Ilirska Bistrica